Srinivasa Higher Secondary School is located in Melaiyur - Poombuhar, Tamil Nadu, India, and is also known as SHSS. This school was founded by Gowriyammal Ramalingam in the year of 1965. This school is under the authority of Tamil Nadu State Board. It is one of the famous school in Mayiladuthurai district. SHSS offers school education in both Tamil & English languages. Kannagi temple is also available in inside school campus.

High schools and secondary schools in Tamil Nadu
Education in Mayiladuthurai district
Educational institutions established in 1965
1965 establishments in Madras State